Samantha Marie Ware (born September 3, 1991), also known by her singer stage name Sameya, is an American actress and singer. She is best known for portraying Jane Hayward in the sixth season of Glee (2015), as well as Angela Archer in the Netflix series What/If (2019). Ware also played Lily in the Nike web series Margot vs. Lily (2016).

Early life and career 
Hailing from Lincoln, Nebraska, Ware started her acting career while attending Doane University at the age of 19. She started acting in theater productions, being cast in a Las Vegas production of The Lion King as Nala and later in 2012 national tour for The Book of Mormon, for which she won the Helen Hayes Award for Outstanding Supporting Performer. She was subsequently cast in major roles on the TV series Glee and What/If. She also played Peggy Schuyler and Maria Reynolds in the Chicago production of Hamilton.

Personal life 
In June 2020, Ware accused Glee series main cast member Lea Michele, with whom she worked  in late 2014 during Ware's recurring role in the sixth season of the series, of being very rude to her on set, behaving with "traumatic microaggressions". Ware made her comments in direct response to Michele having posted a message on social media saying "George Floyd did not deserve this. This was not an isolated incident and it must end. #BlackLives Matter", though she did not specifically state that Michele's rude behavior towards new actors with minor roles was akin to the racism involved in the murder of George Floyd.

Two other actors who co-starred with Michele in the main cast, Heather Morris and Amber Riley, made statements confirming that Michele could be frustratingly rude to everyone on set, but neither saw any link between her wide-ranging rudeness and the implication of Michele being racist. Michele responded with an apology, noting that the comments from numerous cast members in response to Ware's accusation had made her aware that her general treatment of all cast members during those years was "insensitive or inappropriate", a sign of "immaturity", understood that she was "unnecessarily difficult" towards others around her, and she would "keep working to better myself and take responsibility for my actions."

Filmography

Film and television

References

External links
 
 
 

1991 births
Living people
21st-century American actresses
21st-century American women singers
African-American actresses
American musical theatre actresses
American stage actresses
American film actresses
American television actresses
21st-century African-American women singers
American women pop singers
Actors from Lincoln, Nebraska
Musicians from Lincoln, Nebraska
Actresses from Nebraska
Singers from Nebraska
21st-century American singers